Blodgett Mills is a hamlet and census-designated place (CDP) in Cortland County, New York, United States. The population was 303 at the 2010 census. It is in the town of Cortlandville, southeast of the city of Cortland.

Geography
Blodgett Mills is located in the southeastern part of Cortlandville and is bordered to the south by the town of Virgil. The Tioughnioga River forms the eastern edge of the CDP and flows south to the Chenango River and ultimately to the Susquehanna River.

U.S. Route 11 passes just east of the community and is accessed by a bridge over the Tioughnioga. US-11 leads northwest  to the center of Cortland and south  to Marathon. Interstate 81 runs just east of US-11 but is not directly accessible from Blodgett Mills.

Demographics

References

Census-designated places in New York (state)
Census-designated places in Cortland County, New York